Natalie Ann Pack (born March 30, 1989) is an American fashion model and real estate agent who held the title of Miss California USA 2012. She is also known for competing on America's Next Top Model, Cycle 12.

Early life
Pack was born and raised in Palos Verdes, California. She currently lives in Newport Beach, California and attended the University of California, Irvine, where she was on the Dean's List. In 2012 Pack interned at Hoag Memorial Hospital Presbyterian and hoped to go to medical school to become an OBGYN.

In 2005, Pack appeared in an episode of The Dog Whisperer with Cesar Millan.

Career

America's Next Top Model 
At the age of 19, Pack was the second contestant (after Aminat Ayinde) to be selected to participate on the twelfth cycle of America's Next Top Model. Over her stay, she won three challenges (two individually and one with fellow contestant Fo Porter), received one second call-out and one third call-out. Pack also did not receive a makeover because host Tyra Banks believed she looked modelesque as she was. After Aminat Ayinde survived her second consecutive bottom two appearance, Pack was the eighth contestant eliminated from the competition and the first to be eliminated abroad in Sao Paulo, Brazil after a photo shoot where the contestants emulated the late Carmen Miranda. Judges Miss J. Alexander and Fernanda Motta believed that she looked "exhausted" and that "the sparkle was missing" in Pack's photo, despite Pack's insistence that Jay Manuel was complimentary of her photos.

Following her elimination from America's Next Top Model, Pack signed to Ford Models in Los Angeles and is currently signed with NEXT Model Management in Miami. She has modeled for Jockey International and BL!SSS magazine. She has also walked for Billabong and Dona Daneshi. In 2015, she was featured in ads for Guess.

Miss California USA 
Pack participated in the Miss California USA pageant as "Miss Hoag Hospital", where she was interning while attending University of California, Irvine. Despite never having participated in any previous beauty pageants, Pack won the title and was crowned by outgoing titleholder (and Miss Teen USA 2006) Katie Blair. She competed in the Miss USA 2012 competition on June 3, 2012 in Las Vegas, Nevada, and failed to place, ending California's seven-year streak of consecutive placements in Miss USA, from 2005 through 2011.

Filmography

Real estate 
In April 2018 she announced on Twitter and Instagram that she had passed her real estate exam. and later joined her father's Real Estate business, operating as "The Pack Team".

Personal life
In September 2017, Pack became engaged to boyfriend, actor Aaron O'Connell. On July 21, 2018, Natalie and Aaron O'Connell were married in Italy.

References

External links 
Natalie Pack at the Fashion Model Directory

Natalie Pack on Twitter
Natalie Pack, Realtor at Keller Williams website

1989 births
Living people
America's Next Top Model contestants
American beauty pageant winners
American female models
Beauty pageant contestants from California
Miss USA 2012 delegates
People from Palos Verdes, California